Michelle Davina Hoogendoorn (born 12 November 1995), known by her stage name Davina Michelle, is a Dutch singer and YouTuber. Her cover of the song "Duurt te lang" reached the number 1 spot in the Dutch Top 40, the Mega Top 50 and the Dutch Single Top 100.

Career

2016: Beginnings with Idols 
In 2016, Hoogendoorn participated in the fifth season of Idols. During her audition, she sang Jessie J's "Nobody's Perfect", after which she went on to the theater round and the duet round, where she was eliminated.

2017: Breakthrough on YouTube 
In February 2017, Hoogendoorn started her own YouTube-channel under the pseudonym Davina Michelle, where she would upload her cover version of an English-language song every week. On 21 August 2017, she posted her cover of "What About Us" by the American singer Pink. In October, Glamour posted a video review by Pink where she called the cover amazing and said "That's better than I will ever sound". Hoogendoorns video went viral, after which she performed multiple times in TV programs like RTL Late Night and De Wereld Draait Door and in various venues in the United States. As of June 2020, the video has over 17 millions views and Hoogendoorn’s own channel has over 1 million subscribers. She also got to open for Pink during her Beautiful Trauma Tour in the Hague in 2019.

In December 2017, Hoogendoorn published the single "Ga" in cooperation with the Efteling and Sterre (played by Lilo van den Bosch). It served as the official soundtrack for the musical Sprookjessprokkelaar, created by the Efteling.

2018: Beste Zangers and debut single 
In 2018, Hoogendoorn participated in the eleventh season of the AVROTROS-show Beste Zangers. In the fifth episode, she performed a cover of the song '"Duurt te lang" by rapper Glen Faria (also known as MC Fit). Two days after the episode was broadcast, the song reached the first place of most downloaded songs on iTunes in the Netherlands. Later in 2018, it reached the number 1 spot in the Dutch Top 40, the Mega Top 50 and the Dutch Single Top 100. In November 2018, the single was certified gold.

2021: Eurovision Song Contest and Formula One Dutch Grand Prix 
On 18 May 2021, Hoogendoorn performed her new single "Sweet Water" at the first semi-final of the Eurovision Song Contest 2021, held in her birth city Rotterdam, as part of an interval act titled "The Power of Water" alongside Dutch actress Thekla Reuten.

On 5 September 2021, Hoogendoorn performed the Dutch national anthem ahead of the 2021 Dutch Grand Prix at Circuit Zandvoort, the first Formula 1 race to be held in the country since 1985. She repeated her performance for the podium ceremony after Dutch driver Max Verstappen won the event.

Discography

Albums

Singles

References

External links
 

 Davina Michelle Interview with www.femalevoices.de

1995 births
Living people
21st-century Dutch singers
Dutch YouTubers
21st-century Dutch women singers